Nathaniel Albertson (June 10, 1800 – December 16, 1863) was a U.S. Representative from Indiana from 1849 to 1851.

Biography 
Born in Fairfax, Virginia, Albertson moved to Salem, Indiana, and engaged in agricultural pursuits.
He served as member of the State house of representatives 1838–1840.
He moved to Floyd County in 1835 and settled in Greenville, near New Albany, and resumed agricultural pursuits.

Congress 
Albertson was elected as a Democrat to the Thirty-first Congress (March 4, 1849 – March 3, 1851). As a congressman, he voted in favor of the Fugitive Slave Act.
He was an unsuccessful candidate for reelection in 1850 to the Thirty-second Congress.

Later career and death 
He resumed agricultural pursuits.
He moved to Keokuk, Iowa, in 1853 and engaged in mercantile pursuits.
He moved to Boonville, Missouri, in 1856 and continued mercantile pursuits.
He settled in Central City, Colorado, in 1860 and engaged in the hotel business.
He also became interested in mining.

He died in Central City, Colorado, December 16, 1863.
He was interred in Central City Graveyard.

References

1800 births
1863 deaths
Politicians from Fairfax, Virginia
Democratic Party members of the United States House of Representatives from Indiana
19th-century American politicians
People from Central City, Colorado